KYUR, virtual channel 13 (VHF digital channel 12), is a dual ABC/CW+-affiliated television station licensed to Anchorage, Alaska, United States. The station is owned by Vision Alaska LLC; Coastal Television Broadcasting Company LLC, which owns Fox affiliate KTBY (channel 4), operates KYUR under joint sales and shared services agreements (JSA/SSA). The two stations share studios on East Tudor Road in Anchorage; KYUR's transmitter is located in the Matanuska-Susitna Borough. Some of KYUR's programming is broadcast to rural communities via low-power translators through the Alaska Rural Communications Service (ARCS).

KYUR is the flagship station of a trio of ABC and digital CW affiliates covering Alaska under the "Your Alaska Link" brand, which also includes KATN in Fairbanks and KJUD in Juneau.

History
KYUR signed on the air on October 31, 1967, as KHAR-TV. It was the third television station in Anchorage, after KTVA (channel 11) and KENI-TV (channel 2, now KTUU-TV). The station was launched by Sourdough Broadcasters, a company headed by Willis R. "Bill" Harpel, one of Alaska's broadcasting pioneers. Harpel began his broadcasting career in the early 1940s at Anchorage radio station KFQD, and was previously the owner of radio stations in Ellensburg and Mercer Island, Washington. Prior to the launch of the television station, he started Anchorage radio stations KHAR-AM in 1961 and KHAR-FM (now KBRJ) in 1966. A short time after the television station signed on the air, on January 13, 1968, Harpel died in a snowmobile accident near Girdwood, south of Anchorage. He was 46 years old. His widow, Patricia, took over the reins at a time when the station's future was uncertain.

For its first three-plus years on the air, KHAR was unable to obtain a network affiliation, forcing it to operate as an independent station. Finally, in 1970, it took the NBC affiliation from KENI. Patricia Harpel became sole owner of Sourdough Broadcasters at around the same time. KHAR swapped affiliations with KENI a year later and joined ABC; that same year, it changed its call letters to KIMO.

In 1972, KIMO opened its own taping facility in Seattle so it could tape ABC shows directly off the network feed of Seattle's KOMO-TV. The station brought Mister Rogers' Neighborhood and some other PBS programs to Anchorage in the early 1970s, before KAKM signed on in 1975. The station had the top local newscasts in Anchorage from 1977 until 1986, when it was surpassed by KTUU.

In 1995, owner Smith Media bought KJUD in Juneau. Having bought Fairbanks' KATN a decade earlier, Smith merged all three of Alaska's ABC affiliates into the "Alaska's Superstation" network, with KIMO as the flagship station.

Smith sold KIMO and the remainder of the "ABC Alaska's Superstation" system to Vision Alaska LLC in 2010. When the sale was completed, on May 13, 2010, Coastal Television Broadcasting Company LLC (which owns Fox affiliate KTBY) entered into joint sales and shared services agreements with Vision Alaska to operate KYUR. On January 1, 2011, KIMO changed its call letters to KYUR and all of the stations were co-branded as "Your Alaska Link".

In April 2020, as a result of impending economic concerns caused by the COVID-19 pandemic, KYUR and KTBY announced plans to outsource its news production to the national NewsNet service, which began operations one year earlier. All of the stations' newscasts outside of prime time, including Good Day Alaska, were canceled, and the majority of the local staff were laid off. By the end of the month, KYUR's news output had been reduced to a 30-minute newscast at 10 p.m. and KTBY was reduced to an hour-long newscast at 9 p.m. Both of these newscasts were temporarily branded as NewsNet Alaska, featuring a brief local news segment produced in Anchorage, with the rest of the broadcast utilizing the NewsNet national feed produced out of Cadillac, Michigan. Despite the reduction in local news, KYUR and KTBY have opted to use the NewsNet national branding "More News. More Often." in their broadcasts.

Sports programming
KYUR and its sister stations are affiliated with the television network of the NFL's Green Bay Packers. The station carries the network's preseason games and surrounding in-season programming (including its Tuesday night game recap and Wednesday night coach's show) originating from Green Bay, Wisconsin.

Notable former on-air staff
 John Seibel, sports director (1997–2000), later worked at ESPN Radio for nearly a decade
 Kathy Tebow Sharp, weather anchor (1980s), Miss Alaska in 1976

Technical information

Subchannels
The station's digital signal is multiplexed:

Analog-to-digital conversion
KYUR shut down its analog signal, over VHF channel 13, on June 12, 2009, the official date on which full-power television stations in the United States transitioned from analog to digital broadcasts under federal mandate. The station's digital signal remained on its pre-transition VHF channel 12. Through the use of PSIP, digital television receivers display the station's virtual channel as its former VHF analog channel 13.

Former translator 
KYUR formerly ran translator K61CB on a road outside of Eagle River, Anchorage. The translator shut down in 2009 due to the license lapsing in 2007, and the license was deleted in January 2010 due to not broadcasting for a year.

References

External links
 

1967 establishments in Alaska
ABC network affiliates
The CW affiliates
Television channels and stations established in 1967
YUR